is a Japanese actress, voice actress and former singer affiliated with the Amuleto talent agency. She voiced main characters Hina Satou in Tesagure! Bukatsu-mono, Taeko Nomura in Coppelion, Mutsuki in Danchigai, krkr in Gdgd Fairies, Teruha Andō in Girls Beyond the Wasteland, Yūki Asano in Kyo no Gononi, Miho Edogawa in Level E, and Natsume in Master of Martial Hearts.  She also voices supporting characters such as: Esdeath in Akame ga Kill, Varda in Engage Planet Kiss Dum, Mari Kurokawa in Gate, Arsene in Tantei Opera Milky Holmes, Miho in Suzuka, Kanon in Pretty Rhythm and Rinko Shirokane in BanG Dream! (2017–2018).

On June 30, 2018, it was announced that Akesaka would retire from singing due to sudden hearing loss and left Roselia on September 17, 2018. However, she remained involved in the industry by continuing her voice acting work.

Filmography

Anime

Television
2004
Koi Kaze, Futaba Anzai

2005
Suzuka, Miho Fujikawa
Mushi-Shi, Nami

2006
Onegai My Melody, Kou Usui
Renkin 3-kyuu Magical? Pokahn, Aiko
Himawari!, Tsubaki Kazama
Galaxy Angel Rune, Nano-Nano Pudding
Katekyo Hitman Reborn!, Chrome Dokuro

2007
Jinzo Konchu Kabuto Borg VxV, Rika
Himawari Too!!, Tsubaki Kazama
IDOLM@STER: XENOGLOSSIA, Suzushiro
Engage Planet Kiss Dum, Varda
Lucky Star, Matsuri Hiiragi
Night Wizard The Animation, Mayuri Wanstein
Goshūshō-sama Ninomiya-kun, Hinako Ayakawa

2008
Shugo Chara!, Kotone Himeno (ep 49), Manami, Paaru (ep 36–37)
Sekirei, Kuno
Kannagi: Crazy Shrine Maidens, Art club member, Female student (ep 8–9, 11), Waitress (ep 6)
Shugo Chara!! Doki—, Manami, Nami (ep 78)
Kyo no Gononi, Yuki Asano

2009
Guin Saga, Milal
Umi Monogatari: Anata ga Ite Kureta Koto, Ichikawa
Jewelpet, Garnet
Sweet Blue Flowers, Amy

2010
The Qwaser of Stigmata, Lulu Shiizaki
Hime Chen! Otogi Chikku Idol Lilpri, Momoka Hoshino
Mitsudomoe, Futaba Marui
Tantei Opera Milky Holmes, Arsène

2011
Oniichan no Koto Nanka Zenzen Suki Janain Dakara ne—!!, Kosutomo
Mitsudomoe Zōryōchū!, Futaba Marui
Level E, Miho Edogawa
Battle Girls - Time Paradox, Ieyasu Tokugawa, Tokunyan
Ground Control to Psychoelectric Girl, Ryūko's kōhai
Softenni, Kurusu Fuyukawa
Pretty Rhythm Aurora Dream, Kanon Tōdō
The Qwaser of Stigmata II, Ruru Shiizaki
Baka to Test to Shōkanjū: Ni!, 3rd grade girl B
Maken-Ki! Battling Venus, Yang Ming
gdgd Fairies, Fusako Mochida

2012
Recorder and Randsell, Kishima-san
Another, Samu Watanabe
Gokujyo, Madoka Owada
Recorder and Randsell Re, TV
Ginga e Kickoff!!, Kazue Ota
Pretty Rhythm: Dear My Future, Chae Kyoung, Kanon Tōdō
Humanity Has Declined, Child, Fairy, Girl (ep 3), Hamster (Special 3)
Sword Art Online, Moderator

2013
Hakkenden: Eight Dogs of the East, Ayane Mizuki
Majestic Prince, Naomi
Date A Live, Shiizaki
Mushibugyō, Haru
Fantasista Doll, Anne (ep 7–11), Edmonton (ep 7)
Futari wa Milky Holmes, Arsène
Coppelion, Taeko Nomura

2014
Akame ga Kill!, Esdeath
Tesagure! Bukatsu-mono Encore, Hina Satō
Wake Up, Girls!, Reina Suzuki
Yu-Gi-Oh! Arc-V, Ayu Ayukawa

2015
Urawa no Usagi-chan, Tokiwa Kamikizaki
Danchigai, Mutsuki Nakano
Tantei Kageki Milky Holmes TD, Henriette Mystere
Gate: Jieitai Kanochi nite, Kaku Tatakaeri, Mari Kurokawa
Noragami Aragato, Kazuha, Karuha

2016
Shōjotachi wa Kōya o Mezasu, Teruha Andō
Nanbaka, Momoko Hyakushiki

2017
BanG Dream!, Rinko Shirokane

2018
BanG Dream! Girls Band Party! Pico, Rinko Shirokane
Harukana Receive, Youna Aragaki
School Babysitters, Maria Inomata
Muhyo & Roji's Bureau of Supernatural Investigation, Rio Kurotori

2020
Diary of Our Days at the Breakwater, Makoto Ohno
Shadowverse, Malgrit Valoa 
Muhyo & Roji's Bureau of Supernatural Investigation Season 2, Rio Kurotori

2021
Vivy: Fluorite Eye's Song, Grace

2022
Musasino! as Tokiwa Kamikizaki
Reiwa no Di Gi Charat, Brocco-desu

2023
Isekai Shōkan wa Nidome Desu, Loa

Musicals
Galaxy Angel (2005), Vanilla H
School Rumble (2005), Yakumo Tsukamoto

Original video animation (OVA)

Indian Summer (2007), Minori, Theme Song Performance (ED)
Lucky Star (2008), Matsuri Hiiragi
Zettai Shougeki: Platonic Heart (2008), Natsume Honma

Video games
Action Taimanin, Onisaki Kirara
Arknights, Aurora
ASH: Archaic Sealed Heat, Aisya
Atelier Meruru, Meruru
BanG Dream! Girls Band Party!, Rinko Shirokane
Busou Shinki Battle Masters Mk.2, Vervietta
Corpse Party, Miku Shirayume
DC Super Hero Girls: Teen Power, Star Sapphire / Carol Ferris
Disgaea 5: Alliance of Vengeance, Usalia
Fate/Grand Order, Katō Danzō
Galaxy Angel II, Nano-Nano Pudding
Granblue Fantasy, Lamretta
Hyper Galaxy Fleet, Hagiwara Yurian
League of Legends, Sejuani
Reborn! series, Chrome Dokuro
Rune Factory 4, Selzauide
Seven Deadly Sins: Grand Cross, Lilia
Shōjotachi wa Kōya o Mezasu, Teruha Andō
Under Night In-Birth, Sion Eltnum Atlasia, Uzuki
Dream Girlfriend

Dubbing roles
Rocko's Modern Life (2004), Sheila
My Little Pony: Friendship Is Magic (2013), Little Strongheart
Lalaloopsy (2016), Jewel Sparkles
Transformers: Animated (2007), Sari Sumdac

Music
Startline as member of Coach☆
Kimiwa Boku-no Energy as a member of New DUP

Radio
Galaxy Angelune (Lantis Network, from April 2006)
Fujimi Teenage Fan Club (Radio Osaka, from April 2006)
Transformers: Kiss Players, Atari Hitotonari
Dejiko Radio (2008)

References

External links
  
 

1988 births
Living people
Japanese video game actresses
Japanese voice actresses
Voice actresses from Saitama Prefecture
21st-century Japanese singers
21st-century Japanese women singers